Élodie Lorandi (born 31 May 1989, in Cannes) is a French Paralympic swimmer who won medals at the 2008 Summer Paralympics and the 2012 Summer Paralympics.

On 1 January 2013, Lorandi was made a Knight (Chevalier) of the Légion d'honneur.

Lorandi also competed as an adaptive rower on the French PR3 mixed coxed four team at the 2018 World Rowing Championships (bronze medal) and at the 2019 World Rowing Championships.

References

External links 
 
 
 
 
 Élodie Lorandi at the Fédération Française de Natation 

1989 births
Living people
French female butterfly swimmers
French female freestyle swimmers
French female medley swimmers
French female rowers
S10-classified Paralympic swimmers
Paralympic swimmers of France
Paralympic silver medalists for France
Paralympic medalists in swimming
Swimmers at the 2008 Summer Paralympics
Swimmers at the 2012 Summer Paralympics
Medalists at the 2008 Summer Paralympics
Medalists at the 2012 Summer Paralympics
Medalists at the World Para Swimming Championships
Medalists at the World Para Swimming European Championships
Mediterranean Games gold medalists for France
Mediterranean Games medalists in swimming
Swimmers at the 2018 Mediterranean Games
World Rowing Championships medalists for France
Chevaliers of the Légion d'honneur
Sportspeople from Cannes
20th-century French women
21st-century French women